Niccolò Radulovich (1627–1702) was a Roman Catholic cardinal.

Biography
Niccolò Radulovich was born in 1627 in Polignano, Italy. 
On 16 Mar 1659, he was consecrated bishop by Marcantonio Franciotti, Cardinal-Priest of Santa Maria della Pace. 

Radulovich died on 27 Oct 1702 in Rome.

While bishop, he was the principal consecrator of Oronzio Filomarini, Bishop of Gallipoli (1700) and Benito Noriega, Bishop of Acerra (1700); and the principal co-consecrator of Giulio Vincenzo Gentile, Archbishop of Genoa (1681).

References

1627 births
1702 deaths
16th-century Italian cardinals
17th-century Italian cardinals
17th-century Italian Roman Catholic archbishops